WINR (680 AM, "US 96.9") is a radio station broadcasting a classic country format. Licensed to Binghamton, New York, the station is owned by iHeartMedia.

History

WINR is Binghamton's second-oldest radio station, having commenced operations on August 5, 1946, as an affiliate of the NBC Radio Network and located at its original frequency assignment of 1490 AM. WINR was founded by the Southern Tier Radio Service, Inc., a firm owned by Donald W. Kramer (1907–1986), a Binghamton attorney who later served as that city's mayor from 1950 until 1957. Early print advertisements for the station, such as in the Binghamton Press and Broadcasting magazine featured the likeness of locally raised thoroughbred Exterminator, winner of the 1918 Kentucky Derby who served as the inspiration for the WINR call letters ("Winner").

In April 1951 the Federal Communications Commission granted WINR permission to relocate from 1490 to its present dial location at 680 AM; the move occurred in early 1952. In August 1954 WINR was awarded a construction permit to build Binghamton's second television station, which became WINR-TV (channel 40) when it went on the air in November 1957. Several months earlier in January 1957, Southern Tier Radio Service sold WINR and its channel 40 permit to the Binghamton Press, an arm of the then-Rochester-based Gannett Company newspaper chain. Gannett split up the stations through separate sales in 1971: WINR radio was sold to a Mobile, Alabama-based broadcaster, while WINR-TV went to tower manufacturer Stainless, Inc., who changed that outlet's callsign to WICZ-TV.

In recent years, WINR was host to the nationally syndicated nightly adult standards radio program "The Clinton Ferro Program" starring Clinton Ferro from 2000 to 2002. The show was syndicated in 82 markets nationwide until Ferro's passing in 2002.

On January 25, 2012, WINR changed their format from adult standards to oldies, branded as "Oldies 680". On April 11, 2013, WINR rebranded as "Oldies 96-9" after the station added an FM translator, W245BV (96.9 FM) in Endwell.

On December 8, 2014, WINR changed their format to classic country, branded as "US 96.9".

References

External links

INR
IHeartMedia radio stations
Classic country radio stations in the United States
Radio stations established in 1946
1946 establishments in New York (state)